Whitenife is an India-based luxury company, that manufactures products using only animal-friendly materials such as sculptural jewellery, couture apparels and art décor.

History
Whitenife was founded by Sonia Agarwal in November 2012. Whitenife started working to develop eco-friendly leather, to curb the demand for genuine animal leather in 2012. Due to patent conflicts, the ongoing research was put to rest. Simultaneously, Whitenife secured exclusive rights to the use of Elfh, a patented, mineral based material, that was 89% close to genuine elephant ivory.

The company introduced the material to several artisan communities across India and now has artisans as a part of their team. The company was certified by PETA and had their first showcase on the NYSE in year 2013. The same year, Whitenife was invited by JISA (Japanese Ivory Sculptors Association).

Elfh  
Elfh is a mineral based composite, 89% similar to genuine elephant ivory in mechanical and aesthetical properties. The composite is patent registered under ELFORYN and has been developed by a group of European scientists.

Craftsmanship 
Many of the products of Whitenife are entirely handcrafted and can take up to 450 hours of working. Whitenife has a team of artisans working from remote parts of Rajasthan, Kerala & West Bengal.

Notable designs 
Whitenife was also the first Indian design company to design the crown for an international beauty pageant. The company designed crowns for Miss World Australia, Miss Grand Australia and Miss Supranational Australia in 2014.

Associations 
The concept and working of Whitenife has been covered by several publications, including The Times of India and Entrepreneur, Society Interiors, Verve, and Time & Style.

References 

 
 
 
 
 
 

Indian companies established in 2012
Manufacturing companies based in Mumbai
Jewellery companies of India
2012 establishments in Maharashtra
Manufacturing companies established in 2012